The Hollywood Apartments, at 234 E. 100 South in Salt Lake City, Utah, were built in 1909.  The property was listed on the National Register of Historic Places in 1994.

It is significant as a representative example of more than 180 apartment buildings built in Salt Lake City during 1900-1933 that were part of transformation of the city into an urban environment.  The building was built and owned by J.M. Wilfley.

References

Residential buildings on the National Register of Historic Places in Utah
Neoclassical architecture in Utah
Residential buildings completed in 1909
Buildings and structures in Salt Lake City
National Register of Historic Places in Salt Lake City